Honour Your Mother (Spanish: Honrarás a tu madre) is a 1951 Argentine drama film directed by Alberto D'Aversa.

Cast
 Armando Bo 
 Mario Chaves 
 Nelson de la Fuente 
 José María Fra 
 Olga Gatti 
 Rodolfo Onetto 
 Carlos Perelli 
 Virginia Romay 
 Amalia Sánchez Ariño
 Abel Togni as Presidiario

References

Bibliography
 Jorge Abel Martín. Cine argentino. Ediciones Corregidor, 1982.

External links
 

1951 films
1951 drama films
Argentine drama films
1950s Spanish-language films
Argentine black-and-white films
Films directed by Alberto D'Aversa
1950s Argentine films